Rattlestick Theater is a non-profit off-Broadway theater based in the West Village, New York.

History 
Founded in 1994 by Gary Bonasorte and David van Asselt, Rattlestick Theater produces new voices and new works that are provocative and immediate in both form and substance. Rattlestick has a deep commitment to producing fierce works that challenge and stimulate audiences to confront the complexities of our culture. Notable productions include: Diana Oh's {mylingerieplay}, Dael Orlandersmith's Until the Flood, Samuel D. Hunter's The Few and Lewiston/Clarkston, Jesse Eisenberg's The Revisionist, Jonathan Tolins’ Buyer and Cellar, Lucy Thurber's
The Hilltown Plays, Adam Rapp's The Hallway Trilogy, and Martyna Majok's Ironbound, among many, many others.

Granted two Obie awards, Rattlestick is an artistic home to artists at all stages of their careers. They help launch new voices while giving space for celebrated artists to test their boldest ideas. Each year, Rattlestick produces a season of daring new Mainstage plays, hosts dozens of readings and supplemental programs through their New Voices/New Works programming, brings teaching artists to NYC schools, and engages deeply with community organizations with ties to their productions’ content and themes. They believe in the power of theater to provoke conversations that lead to social change.

Rattlestick's production history by year includes:

References 

The Obie Awards, 2006-2007 Winners

External links 
 

Off-Broadway theaters
Theatre companies in New York City
1994 establishments in New York City
Theatres in Manhattan